Smartville can refer to:

 Smartville, Hambach, France
 Smartsville, California, formerly named Smartville.
 Smartville Block, a geologic zone in the Sierra foothills of California